La cena, internationally released as The Dinner, is a 1998 Italian commedia all'italiana film directed by Ettore Scola.

For their performance the male ensemble cast won the Nastro d'Argento for Nastro d'Argento for Best Supporting Actor, while Stefania Sandrelli won the Nastro d'Argento for Best Supporting Actress.

Cast 
 Fanny Ardant : Flora
 Antonio Catania : Mago Adam
 Francesca D'Aloja : Alessandra
 Riccardo Garrone : Diomede
 Vittorio Gassman : Maestro Pezzullo
 Giancarlo Giannini : Professore
 Marie Gillain : Allieva
 Nello Mascia : Menghini
 Adalberto Maria Merli : Bricco
 Stefania Sandrelli : Isabella
 Lea Gramsdorff: Sabrina 
 Corrado Olmi: Arturo, husband of Flora
 Eros Pagni: Duilio
 Daniela Poggi: the stranger 
 Giorgio Tirabassi: Franco 
 Giorgio Colangeli: Vincenzo Petrosillo

References

External links

1998 films
1998 comedy films
Cooking films
Films directed by Ettore Scola
Films scored by Armando Trovajoli
Commedia all'italiana
Films set in Rome
Films with screenplays by Ettore Scola
1990s Italian films